The 1939 International cricket season was from April 1939 to August 1939.

Season overview

June

West Indies in England

Scotland in Ireland

August

Netherlands in England

References

1939 in cricket